Karishki (also Romanized as Karīshkī, Kereshkī, and Kerīshkī; also known as Qal‘eh Kirishki) is a village in Bala Deh Rural District, Beyram District, Larestan County, Fars Province, Iran. At the 2006 census, its population was 433, and 114 families.

References 

Populated places in Larestan County